The artistic gymnastics competitions at the 2022 Mediterranean Games in Oran took place between 26–29 June at the Olympic Complex Sports Hall.

Schedule

Medalists

Men

Women

Medal table

Participating nations

References

External links
Results book

Sports at the 2022 Mediterranean Games
2022
Mediterranean Games